Hyperprolactinaemia is the presence of abnormally high levels of prolactin in the blood. Normal levels average to about 13 ng/mL in women, and 5 ng/mL in men, with an upper normal limit of serum prolactin levels being 15-25 ng/mL for both. When the fasting levels of prolactin in blood exceed this upper limit,  hyperprolactinemia is indicated.

Prolactin (PRL) is a peptide hormone produced by lactotroph cells in the anterior pituitary gland. PRL is involved in lactation after pregnancy and plays a vital role in breast development. Hyperprolactinemia may cause galactorrhea (production and spontaneous flow of breast milk), infertility, and disruptions in the normal menstrual period in women; as well as hypogonadism, infertility and erectile dysfunction in men.

Although hyperprolactinemia can result from normal physiological changes during pregnancy and breastfeeding, it can also be caused by other etiologies. For example, high prolactin levels could result from diseases affecting the hypothalamus and pituitary gland. Other organs, such as the liver and kidneys, could affect prolactin clearance and consequently, prolactin levels in the serum. The disruption of prolactin regulation could also be attributed to external sources such as medications.

In the general population, the prevalence of hyperprolactinemia is 0.4%. The prevalence increases to as high as 17% in women with reproductive diseases, such as polycystic ovary syndrome. In cases of tumor-related hyperprolactinemia, prolactinoma is the most common culprit of consistently high levels of prolactin as well as the most common type of pituitary tumor. For non-tumor related hyperprolactinemia, the most common cause is medication-induced prolactin secretion. Particularly, antipsychotics have been linked to a majority of non-tumor related hyperprolactinemia cases due to their prolactin-rising and prolactin-sparing mechanisms. Typical antipsychotics have been shown to induce significant, dose-dependent increases in prolactin levels up to 10-fold the normal limit. Atypical antipsychotics vary in their ability to elevate prolactin levels, however, medications in this class such as risperidone and paliperidone carry the highest potential to induce hyperprolactinemia in a dose-dependent manner similar to typical antipsychotics.

Signs and symptoms
In women, high blood levels of prolactin are typically associated with hypoestrogenism, anovulatory infertility, and changes in menstruation. Menstruation disturbances experienced in women commonly manifests as amenorrhea or oligomenorrhea. In the latter case, irregular menstrual flow may result in abnormally heavy and prolonged bleeding (menorrhagia). Women who are not pregnant or nursing may also unexpectedly begin producing breast milk (galactorrhea), a condition that is not always associated with high prolactin levels. For instance, many premenopausal women experiencing hyperprolactinemia do not experience galactorrhea and only some women who experience galactorrhea will be diagnosed with hyperprolactinemia. Thus, galactorrhea may be observed in individuals with normal prolactin levels and does not necessarily indicate hyperprolactinemia. This phenomenon is likely due to galactorrhea requiring adequate levels of progesterone or estrogen to prepare the breast tissue. Additionally, some women may also experience loss of libido and breast pain, particularly when prolactin levels rise initially, as the hormone promotes tissue changes in the breast.

In men, the most common symptoms of hyperprolactinemia are decreased libido, sexual dysfunction, erectile dysfunction/impotence, infertility, and gynecomastia. Unlike women, men do not experience reliable indicators of elevated prolactin such as menstruation to prompt immediate medical consultation. As a result, the early signs of hyperprolactinemia are generally more difficult to detect and may go unnoticed until more severe symptoms are present. For instance, symptoms such as loss of libido and sexual dysfunction are subtle, arise gradually, and may falsely indicate a differential cause. Many men with pituitary tumor-associated hyperprolactinemia may forego clinical help until they begin to experience serious endocrine and vision complications, such as major headaches or eye problems.

Long-term hyperprolactinaemia can lead to detrimental changes in bone metabolism as a result of hypoestrogenism and hypoandrogenism. Studies have shown that chronically elevated prolactin levels lead to increased bone resorption and suppression of bone formation, leading to reduced bone density, increased risk of fractures, and increased risk of osteoporosis. The chronic presence of hyperprolactinemia can lead to hypogonadism and osteolysis in men.

Causes
Prolactin secretion is regulated by both stimulatory and inhibitory mechanisms. Dopamine acts on pituitary lactotroph D2 receptors to inhibit prolactin secretion while other peptides and hormones, such as thyrotropin releasing hormone (TRH), stimulate prolactin secretion. As a result, hyperprolactinemia may be caused by disinhibition (e.g., compression of the pituitary stalk or reduced dopamine levels) or excess production. The most common cause of hyperprolactinemia is prolactinoma (a type of pituitary adenoma). A blood serum prolactin level of 1000–5000 mIU/L (47-235 ng/mL) may arise from either mechanism, however levels >5000 mIU/L (>235 ng/mL) is likely due to the activity of an adenoma. Prolactin blood levels are typically correlated to the size the tumors. Pituitary tumors smaller than 10 mm in diameter, or microadenomas, tend to have prolactin levels <200 ng/mL. Macroadenomas larger than 10 mm in diameter possess prolactin >1000 ng/mL.

Hyperprolactinemia inhibits the secretion of gonadotropin-releasing hormone (GnRH) from the hypothalamus, which in turn inhibits the release of follicle-stimulating hormone (FSH) and luteinizing hormone (LH) from the pituitary gland and results in diminished gonadal sex hormone production (termed hypogonadism). This is the cause of many of the symptoms described below.

In many people, elevated prolactin levels remain unexplained and may represent a form of hypothalamic–pituitary–adrenal axis dysregulation.

Physiological causes
Physiological (i.e., non-pathological) causes include: ovulation, pregnancy, breastfeeding, chest wall injury, stress, stress-associated REM sleep, and exercise. During pregnancy, prolactin levels can range up to 600 ng/mL, depending on estrogen concentration. At 6 weeks post-birth (postpartum), estradiol concentrations decrease, and prolactin concentrations return to normal even during breastfeeding. Stress-related factors include physical, exercise, hypoglycemia, myocardial infarction, and surgery. Coitus and sleep can also contribute to an increased prolactin release.

Medications
Prolactin secretion in the pituitary is normally suppressed by the brain chemical dopamine, which binds to dopamine receptors. Drugs that block the effects of dopamine at the pituitary or deplete dopamine stores in the brain may cause the pituitary to secrete prolactin without an inhibitory effect. These drugs include the typical antipsychotics: phenothiazines such as chlorpromazine (Thorazine), and butyrophenones such as haloperidol (Haldol); atypical antipsychotics such as risperidone (Risperdal) and paliperidone (Invega); gastroprokinetic drugs used to treat gastro-esophageal reflux and medication-induced nausea (such as that from chemotherapy): metoclopramide (Reglan) and domperidone; less often, alpha-methyldopa and reserpine, used to control hypertension; and TRH. The use of estrogen-containing oral contraceptives are also known to increase prolactin levels when taken in high doses >35 μg. The sleep drug ramelteon (Rozerem) also increases the risk of hyperprolactinaemia. Particularly, the dopamine antagonists metoclopramide and domperidone are both powerful prolactin stimulators and have been used to stimulate breast milk secretion for decades. However, since prolactin is antagonized by dopamine and the body depends on the two being in balance, the risk of prolactin stimulation is generally present with all drugs that deplete dopamine, either directly or as a rebound effect.

Specific diseases
Prolactinoma or other tumors arising in or near the pituitary — such as those that cause acromegaly may block the flow of dopamine from the brain to the prolactin-secreting cells, likewise, division of the pituitary stalk or hypothalamic disease. Other causes include chronic kidney failure, hypothyroidism, bronchogenic carcinoma and sarcoidosis. Some women with polycystic ovary syndrome may have mildly-elevated prolactin levels.

Nonpuerperal mastitis may induce transient hyperprolactinemia (neurogenic hyperprolactinemia) of about three weeks' duration; conversely, hyperprolactinemia may contribute to nonpuerperal mastitis.

Apart from diagnosing hyperprolactinemia and hypopituitarism, prolactin levels are often checked by physicians in those who have had a seizure, when there is need to differentiate between epileptic seizure or a non-epileptic seizure. Shortly after epileptic seizures, prolactin levels often rise, whereas they are normal in non-epileptic seizures.

Diagnosis
An appropriate diagnosis of hyperprolactinemia starts with conducting a complete clinical history before performing any treatment. Physiological causes, systemic disorders, and the use of certain drugs must be ruled out before the condition is diagnosed. Screening is indicated for those who are asymptomatic and those with elevated prolactin without an associated cause.

The most common causes of hyperprolactinemia are prolactinomas, drug-induced hyperprolactinemia, and macroprolactinemia. Individuals with hyperprolactinemia may present with symptoms including galactorrhea, hypogonadism effects, and/or infertility. The magnitude that prolactin is elevated can be used as an indicator of the etiology of the hyperprolactinemia diagnosis. Prolactin levels over 250 ng/mL may suggest prolactinoma. Prolactin levels less than 100 ng/mL may suggest drug-induced hyperprolactinemia, macroprolactinemia, nonfunctioning pituitary adenomas, or systemic disorders.

Elevated prolactin blood levels are typically assessed in women with unexplained breast milk secretion (galactorrhea) or irregular menses or infertility, and in men with impaired sexual function and milk secretion. If high prolactin levels are present, all known conditions and medications which raises prolactin secretion must be assessed and excluded for diagnosis. After ruling out other causes and prolactin levels remain high, TSH levels are assessed. If TSH levels are elevated, hyperprolactinemia is secondary to hypothyroidism and treated accordingly. If TSH levels are normal, an MRI or CT scan is conducted to assess for any pituitary adenomas. Although hyperprolactinemia is often uncommon in postmenopausal women, prolactinomas detected after menopause are typically macroadenomas. While a plain X-ray of the bones surrounding the pituitary may reveal the presence of a large macroadenoma, small microadenomas will not be apparent. Magnetic resonance imaging (MRI) is the most sensitive test for detecting pituitary tumors and determining their size. MRI scans may be repeated periodically to assess tumor progression and the effects of therapy. Computed Tomography (CT scan) is another indicator of abnormalities in pituitary gland size; it also gives an image of the pituitary, but is less sensitive than the MRI. In addition to assessing the size of the pituitary tumor, physicians also look for damage to surrounding tissues, and perform tests to assess whether production of other pituitary hormones are normal. Depending on the size of the tumor, physicians may request an eye exam that includes the measurement of visual fields.

However, a high measurement of prolactin may also result from the presence of macroprolactin, otherwise known as 'big prolactin' or 'big-big prolactin', in the serum. Macroprolactin occurs when prolactin polymerizes together and can bind with IgG to form complexes. Although this can result in high prolactin levels in some assay tests, macroprolactin is biologically inactive and will not cause symptoms typical of hyperprolactinemia. In those who are asymptomatic or without obvious causes of hyperprolactinemia, macroprolactin should be assessed and ruled out.

Treatment
Treatment for hyperprolactinemia is usually dependent upon its cause, ranging from hypothyroidism, drug-induced hyperprolactinemia, hypothalamic disease, idiopathic hyperprolactinemia, macroprolactin, or prolactinoma. Therefore, in order to provide the proper management of hyperprolactinemia, the pathological form and physiological increase in prolactin levels are differentiated, and the correct cause of hyperprolactinemia must be identified before treatment. For functional asymptomatic hyperprolactinemia, the treatment of choice is removing the associated cause, including antipsychotic therapy. However, prolactin levels should be drawn and monitored both prior to any discontinuation or changes to therapy, and afterwards. With symptomatic hyperprolactinemia, stopping antipsychotic drugs for a short trial period are not recommended due to the risk of exacerbation or relapse of symptoms. Options for treatment include decreasing the dose of antipsychotics, adding aripiprazole as an adjunctive therapy, and switching antipsychotics as a last resort. In pharmacologic hyperprolactinemia, the concerning drug can be switched to another treatment or discontinued entirely. Vitex agnus-castus extract may be tried in cases of mild hyperprolactinemia. No treatment is required in asymptomatic macroprolactin and instead, serial prolactin measurements and pituitary imaging is monitored in a regular follow-up appointments.

Medical therapy is the preferred treatment in prolactinomas. In most cases, medications that are dopamine agonists, such as cabergoline and bromocriptine (often preferred when pregnancy is possible), are the treatment of choice used to decrease prolactin levels and tumor size upon the presence of microadenomas or macroadenomas. A systematic review and meta-analyses has shown that cabergoline is more effective in treatment of hyperprolactinemia than bromocriptine. Other dopamine agonists that have been used less commonly to suppress prolactin include dihydroergocryptine, ergoloid, lisuride, metergoline, pergolide, quinagolide, and terguride. If the prolactinoma does not initially respond to dopamine agonist therapy, such that prolactin levels are still high or the tumor is not shrinking as expected, the dose of the dopamine agonist can be increased in a stepwise fashion to the maximum tolerated dose. Another option is to consider switching between dopamine agonists. It is possible for the prolactinoma to be resistant to bromocriptine but respond well to cabergoline and vice versa. Surgical therapy can be considered if pharmacologic options have been exhausted.

There is evidence to support improvement in outcomes of hyperprolactinemic individuals who have shown to be resistant to or intolerant of the treatment of choice, dopamine agonists, through radiotherapy and surgery.

See also 
 Hypothalamic–pituitary–prolactin axis
 Hypopituitarism

References

External links 

Pituitary disorders
Syndromes